Cox Bluff is a rock and ice bluff just west of Spitz Ridge on the north side of Toney Mountain, in Marie Byrd Land. It was mapped by the United States Geological Survey from ground surveys and U.S. Navy air photos, 1959–66, and named by the Advisory Committee on Antarctic Names for Tony L. Cox, a geomagnetist-seismologist with the Byrd Station winter party, 1966.

References
 

Cliffs of Marie Byrd Land